Frederick Kemper Freeman Jr. (born October 23, 1941) is the active chairman and CEO of Kemper Development Company,  which built and operates Bellevue Square, Bellevue Place, and Lincoln Square, all located in Bellevue, Washington. Kemper represents the third generation of the Freeman family, who have been involved in the growth of the Bellevue community since 1897.  He is a former Republican member of the Washington State House of Representatives from the 48th district  and publicly active in conversations about traffic and transportation in Bellevue.

Freeman family 

Kemper Freeman Jr. is a third-generation resident of Bellevue, Washington. His grandfather, Miller Freeman, was active in state politics and public affairs, including promoting the development of a bridge connecting Seattle, Mercer Island, and Bellevue, and acting as a driving force in anti-Japanese discrimination, agitating for what he called a "white man's Pacific coast". Beginning in 1907, Miller Freeman was a prominent voice calling for the segregation or deportation of Japanese immigrants, whom he saw as a threat to white prosperity. He founded the Anti-Japanese League of Washington in 1916 and was a vocal proponent for the state's 1921 alien land laws, the 1924 Immigration Act, and the 1942 incarceration of American citizens of Japanese ancestry in concentration camps during World War II.

Freeman Jr.'s father, Frederick Kemper Freeman Sr., led the development of what is now Bellevue Square, which opened in 1946.  He also was involved in building Bellevue's first hospital, Overlake Hospital Medical Center. Kemper Freeman Jr. was born on October 23, 1941. He married Betty Austin in 1965 and has two daughters, Amy Schreck and Suzanne McQuaid.

Career 
In 1973, Freeman Jr. was appointed to a vacant seat in the Washington State House of Representatives as a Republican representing the 48th district. After serving for three years, he resigned from the seat to focus on his business in building and development.  He then began working full-time on the expansion and enclosure of Bellevue Square with his father, which re-opened in 1981. In early-1980, Freeman Jr. founded the Kemper Development Company, which has overseen the continued expansion of Bellevue Square as well as development of:

 Bellevue Place, a mixed use property that opened in 1988, housing office space, retail, dining options, and the Hyatt Regency Bellevue. 
 Lincoln Square, which opened in 2005 with condominiums, a movie theater, a bowling alley, restaurants, retail, office space, and the Westin Bellevue.

In total, the three properties (Bellevue Square, Bellevue Place, Lincoln Square) makeup the Bellevue Collection, covering approximately 50 acres of land in downtown Bellevue. In 2016, Bloomberg reported all of Freeman's holdings had a worth of "about $2 billion" of which Freeman and his two daughters owned a majority stake.

Traffic and transportation involvement 
Freeman Jr. often speaks out on the issue of mass transit expansion and congestion reduction. In 2010, he filed a lawsuit against the East Link light rail project that would travel eastwards from Seattle to Bellevue via the reversible lanes of the Homer M. Hadley Memorial Bridge, converting them from car traffic to light rail tracks. In the case, Freeman Jr. cited that the project misused tax dollars as well as proposed other ways to alleviate the area's traffic congestion, including freeway expansion, use of dedicated bus lines, and van pools. In March 2012, courts ruled against Freeman Jr., in favor of the project.  In April 2012, representatives of the Eastside Transportation Association announced intent to appeal the ruling.

In September 2013, Washington Supreme Court ruled that plans to build light rail over I-90 bridge do not violate Washington's Constitution.

Community involvement
Freeman Jr. holds leadership appointments in several community and economic development organizations in the Bellevue area, including:

 Co-chair of the capital campaign and member of the Executive Committee for the Performing Arts Center Eastside (PACE), a series of five venues under construction in Bellevue that will feature theater, dance, and music when complete. The land for PACE was donated by Freeman Jr., who has also made a joint commitment with Microsoft to provide additional funding.
 Trustee for Overlake Hospital Medical Center
 Board Member of Bellevue LifeSpring, formerly Overlake Service League

References

External links
 The Bellevue Collection
 Kemper Development Company
 Kemper Freeman Website

1941 births
Living people
Bellevue, Washington
American philanthropists
American businesspeople
Members of the Washington House of Representatives